Tren may mean:

Tris(2-aminoethyl)amine, a coordination chemistry compound
Trenbolone, a veterinary steroid
Tren, a 1978 Yugoslav film

See also
train